Ubiquitin-conjugating enzyme E2 E3 is a protein that in humans is encoded by the UBE2E3 gene.

The modification of proteins with ubiquitin is an important cellular mechanism for targeting abnormal or short-lived proteins for degradation. Ubiquitination involves at least three classes of enzymes: ubiquitin-activating enzymes, or E1s, ubiquitin-conjugating enzymes, or E2s, and ubiquitin-protein ligases, or E3s. This gene encodes a member of the E2 ubiquitin-conjugating enzyme family. The encoded protein shares 100% sequence identity with the mouse and rat counterparts, which indicates that this enzyme is highly conserved in eukaryotes. Two alternatively spliced transcript variants encoding the same protein have been found for this gene.

References

Further reading